The Brennan conjecture is a mathematical hypothesis (in complex analysis) for estimating (under specified conditions) the integral powers of the moduli of the derivatives of conformal maps into the open unit disk. The conjecture was formulated by James E. Brennan in 1978.

Let  be a conformal map of  onto the open unit disk. The Brennan conjecture states that
 whenever . Brennan proved the result when  for some constant . Bertilsson proved in 1999 that the result holds when , but the full result remains open.

References

Conjectures
Unsolved problems in mathematics